In enzymology, a rRNA (guanine-N1-)-methyltransferase is an enzyme that catalyzes the chemical reaction

S-adenosyl-L-methionine + rRNA  S-adenosyl-L-homocysteine + rRNA containing N1-methylguanine

Thus, the two substrates of this enzyme are S-adenosyl methionine and rRNA, whereas its two products are S-adenosylhomocysteine and rRNA containing N1-methylguanine.

This enzyme belongs to the family of transferases, specifically those transferring one-carbon group methyltransferases.  The systematic name of this enzyme class is S-adenosyl-L-methionine:rRNA (guanine-N1-)-methyltransferase. Other names in common use include ribosomal ribonucleate guanine 1-methyltransferase, and S-adenosyl-L-methionine:rRNA (guanine-1-N-)-methyltransferase.

Structural studies

As of late 2007, only one structure has been solved for this class of enzymes, with the PDB accession code .

References 

 

EC 2.1.1
Enzymes of known structure